USS Silversides (SS/AGSS-236) is a Gato-class submarine, the first ship of the United States Navy to be named for the silversides.

She received a Presidential Unit Citation for cumulative action over four patrols, and twelve battle stars. She presently serves as a museum ship in Muskegon, Michigan, and is a National Historic Landmark.

Construction 
Her keel was laid down on 4 November 1940, by the Mare Island Navy Yard in Vallejo, California. She was launched on 26 August 1941, sponsored by Mrs. Elizabeth H. Hogan, and commissioned on 15 December 1941, with Lieutenant Commander Creed C. Burlingame in command.

Service in World War II

First patrol: April–June 1942 
After shakedown off the California coast, Silversides set course for Hawaii, arriving at Pearl Harbor on 4 April 1942. Departing Pearl Harbor on 30 April, Silversides headed for the Japanese home islands, in the area of Kii Suido, for the first of her many successful war patrols. On 10 May, just after 8:00 local time, the submarine used her  gun to heavily damage the Japanese guard boat Ebisu Maru No.5. During this 75-minute action, an enemy machine-gun bullet killed one of her deck gunners, Torpedoman's Mate Third Class Mike Harbin of Oklahoma, the only man lost in action aboard Silversides during World War II. Harbin was buried at sea later that evening. On 13 May, Silversides fired torpedoes at an enemy submarine; although explosions were heard, a definite sinking could not be confirmed.

On 17 May, while maneuvering through an enemy fishing fleet and approaching her targets, Silversides''' periscope became entangled in a fishnet marked by Japanese flags held aloft on bamboo poles. The sub continued her approach, fishnet and all, and fired three torpedoes at the first ship, a 4,000-ton cargo ship. Two hits tore the victim's stern open. While that ship was sinking, the second cargo ship was also hit, but its fate could not be determined. Patrol boats were closing in as the submarine, probably the only American submarine to make an attack while flying the Japanese flag, quickly left the vicinity. After damaging a freighter and tanker in the same area, Silversides terminated her first war patrol at Pearl Harbor on 21 June.

 Second and third patrols: July–November 1942 Silversidess second war patrol was also conducted in the area of Kii Suido, from 15 July to 8 September. On 28 July, she sank a 4,000-ton transport, followed by the sinking of the passenger/cargo ship Nikkei Maru on 8 August.  She scored damaging hits on a large tanker on the night of 14 August and, on 31 August, sank two enemy trawlers before returning to Pearl Harbor.

Her third war patrol, conducted in the Caroline Islands, did not result in any sinkings, although severe damage was done to a large cargo ship and there were two observed torpedo hits on a Japanese destroyer or light minelayer, which did an undetermined level of damage. She terminated her third patrol at Brisbane, Australia, on 25 November.

 Fourth patrol: December 1942 – January 1943 Silversides departed Brisbane on 17 December 1942 and set course for New Ireland for her fourth war patrol. While far out at sea on the night of 22 December, the submarine's medical orderly, Pharmacist’s Mate First Class Thomas Moore, performed a successful emergency appendectomy on Fireman Second Class George Platter, using ether as anesthesia and rudimentary tools primarily fashioned from kitchen utensils. With the operation over at 3:00 on 23 December, the submarine surfaced only to be immediately forced down by a Japanese destroyer and compelled to endure a severe depth charge attack. Thinking herself safe, Silversides surfaced only to find the destroyer still there. Additionally, a Japanese airplane had arrived on the scene and proceeded to drop three bombs on the submarine, severely damaging her bow planes and causing them to lock on full dive. Silversides managed to level off just short of crush depth and eventually evaded the enemy ship before surfacing to recharge her batteries and effect emergency repairs.

While off Truk on 18 January 1943, Silversides torpedoed and sank her largest target of the war, the 10,022 ton oil tanker Toei Maru. Two days later, the submarine had one of her most productive days of the war.  After paralleling a convoy throughout the daylight hours, she moved on ahead at sundown and lay in wait (an end around position). As the targets moved into range, Silversides fired torpedoes at overlapping targets and sank three enemy ships—the cargo ships Surabaya Maru, Somedono Maru, and Meiu Maru. The attack had scarcely abated when it was discovered that an armed torpedo was stuck in a forward torpedo tube. Since it was impossible to disarm the torpedo, the commanding officer decided to attempt to refire it, an extremely dangerous maneuver. The submarine moved in reverse at top speed and fired. The torpedo shot safely from the tube, disappearing as it moved toward the horizon.

When a serious oil leak was discovered later that night, the submarine left the patrol area two days ahead of schedule and returned to Pearl Harbor on 31 January for a major overhaul.

 Fifth and sixth patrols: May–September 1943 Silversidess fifth war patrol commenced on 17 May and was conducted in the Solomon Islands area. Enroute the patrol area on 28 May, one of the more unusual moments of the war occurred. Stated in the 5th war patrol report as follows:

Proceeded on surface toward assigned position. On the 28th a frigate bird made a high level bombing attack, scoring a direct hit on the bare head and beard of the OOD, Lt. Bienia. No indication by radar prior to attack.

Continuing on, the submarine's primary mission for this patrol was to lay a minefield in Steffan Strait, between New Hanover and New Ireland, but she did not neglect enemy shipping. On the night of 10 – 11 June, she sank the 5,256-ton cargo ship Hide Maru; for her efforts, Silversides was forced to endure a severe depth charging.  She returned to Brisbane for refit on 16 July.

For her sixth war patrol, under newly assigned Lt. Commander John S. "Jack" Coye, Jr., from 21 July to 4 September, Silversides patrolled between the Solomons and the Carolines. Since she was plagued with malfunctioning torpedoes and a scarcity of targets, she returned to Brisbane empty-handed.

 Seventh and eighth patrols: October 1943 – January 1944 Silversides set sail on 5 October for her seventh war patrol, in which she sank four enemy ships in waters ranging from the Solomon Islands to the coast of New Guinea. On 18 October, she torpedoed and sank the cargo ship Tairin Maru, and, on 24 October, made a series of daring attacks to send the cargo ships Tennan Maru and Kazan Maru and the passenger/cargo ship Johore Maru to the bottom. She returned to Pearl Harbor for refit on 8 November.Silversides patrolled off the Palau Islands for her eighth war patrol, where, on 29 December 1943, she brought havoc to an enemy convoy of cargo ships, sinking Tenposan Maru, Shichisei Maru, and Ryuto Maru. She terminated her eighth patrol at Pearl Harbor on 15 January 1944.

 Ninth and tenth patrols: February–June 1944 
For her ninth war patrol, Silversides departed Pearl Harbor on 15 February and set course for waters west of the Marianas Islands. On 16 March, she sank the cargo ship Kofuku Maru. The remainder of the patrol was devoid of worthwhile targets, so the submarine returned to Fremantle on 8 April.

While on her tenth war patrol, again off the Marianas Islands, Silversides destroyed six enemy vessels for a total of over 14,000 tons. On 10 May, she torpedoed and sank the cargo ship Okinawa Maru, followed up with the passenger/cargo ship Mikage Maru; and then sent the converted gunboat Choan Maru Number Two beneath the waves. Ten days later, she added to her score when she sank another converted gunboat, the 998-ton Shosei Maru. On 29 May, the submarine torpedoed and sank the cargo ships Shoken Maru and Horaizan Maru; and then headed for Pearl Harbor, arriving on 11 June. Two days later, she got underway for Mare Island Navy Yard for overhaul, returning to Pearl Harbor on 12 September.

 Eleventh and twelfth patrol: September 1944 – February 1945 Silversides cleared Pearl Harbor on 24 September for her eleventh war patrol, conducted off Kyūshū, Japan. Although this patrol was unproductive, she aided in the rescue of a stricken sister submarine.  had been badly damaged in a severe depth charging and was forced to surface and try to escape while fighting enemy escorts in a gun battle, a task for which a submarine is badly outmatched.  The gunfire flashes brought Silversides to the scene. She deliberately drew the attention of some of the escorts, then quickly dove to escape the gunfire. Soon, submarines  and  joined in helping Silversides to guard Salmon, and in escorting the stricken submarine back to Saipan, arriving on 3 November. Silversides terminated her eleventh patrol at Midway Island on 23 November.Silversides' twelfth war patrol commenced on 22 December 1944, and was spent in the East China Sea. Despite aggressive searching, she found few worthwhile targets.  However, when an opportunity did come her way, Silversides took full advantage. On 25 January 1945, she torpedoed the 4,556-ton cargo ship Malay Maru. She returned to Midway Island on 12 February.

 Thirteenth and fourteenth patrols: March–July 1945 
Although she again found few worthwhile targets, the submarine did manage to damage a large freighter and to sink a trawler before returning to Pearl Harbor on 29 April.Silversidess fourteenth and final war patrol began with a departure from Pearl Harbor on 30 May. This patrol was spent on lifeguard station in support of airstrikes on Honshu, Japan. On 22 July, she rescued a downed fighter pilot from the light aircraft carrier , and two days later recovered a downed United States Army Air Forces airman. She ended this patrol at Apra Harbor, Guam, on 30 July. The submarine was undergoing refit there when the hostilities with Japan ended on 15 August.

 Post-war service: 1945–1969 Silversides transited the Panama Canal on 15 September 1945, arriving at New York City on 21 September. After shifting to New London, Connecticut, she was decommissioned on 17 April 1946 and placed in reserve until 15 October 1947, when she was placed in service as a training ship for Naval Reservists at Chicago, Illinois. After a 1949 overhaul, she remained at Chicago in support of Naval Reserve training as a stationary training vessel for the rest of her service.

The last time Silversides was dry-docked was in 1949, when the submarine went into the reserve fleet and her solid brass propellers were removed.

On 6 November 1962, Silversides was reclassified as an auxiliary submarine with hull classification symbol AGSS-236, and on 30 June 1969, her name was struck from the Naval Vessel Register. The South Chicago Chamber of Commerce promptly applied to the United States Department of the Navy for custody of Silversides to preserve her as a memorial.

 1973–present Silversides became a part of the Combined Great Lakes Navy Association in Chicago, Illinois, behind Chicago's Naval Armory on 24 May 1973. For years, the submarine was tended by a small crew of dedicated volunteers, drawn to her illustrious history and technical marvels. They donated tens of thousands of man-hours to restore her, maintained her at their own expense, and served as docents and chaperones. When association volunteers first stepped on board, they faced a musty, mildewed sub with paint peeling off in sheets inside and out, and junk scattered everywhere. After many years, the refrigeration compartment had produced a growth so thick, it could be measured in multiple inches instead of millimeters. Evidence of water damage prevailed in the forward compartments but the aft end was in reasonably good condition. Topside, the decking was weathered and worn in spots and some areas of the superstructure were rusted and in need of replacement.

Volunteers quickly took steps to stop the decay. Rotted lines were replaced and the boat re-secured to the pier, the bilges were pumped dry, electric power and heat were brought on board and a leak in the No. 3 torpedo tube sealed off. The first major renovation completed was stripping, undercoating and repainting the hull to the waterline. The job took several months, with a break over the winter, but once completed, the Silversides looked nearly new. Below decks, the boat was cleaned and general restoration got underway. Considerable rewiring was done to bring light to all areas of the boat, the plumbing underwent investigation for leaks sprung in once-frozen pipes and a crew set about surveying the Fairbanks Morse 38D8  nine-cylinder, opposed-piston engines. The seven-cylinder auxiliary engine was brought back to life in 1975.

She was moved to Navy Pier in 1979. That July, the first main engine, No. 3, was brought back to life for the first time since 1946. The No. 4 engine was restored in time for the 1984 US Submarine Veterans of World War II convention. In 1987, the submarine was moved to Muskegon, Michigan, to serve as the centerpiece of the new Great Lakes Naval Memorial & Museum.

Normally, United States Navy submarines are dry-docked every five years while on active duty. If permanently moored in freshwater the maintenance interval can be extended to 25 years. In 2004, 55 years after Silversidess last dry-docking, the museum and two submarine veterans organizations formed a "Save the Silversides" fund and began soliciting tax-deductible donations through veterans groups and military publications.

 Gallery 

 Film production Silversides was used for exterior scenes in the 2002 film Below to depict the fictional USS Tiger Shark. She was towed in Lake Michigan for filming.

 Awards Silversides received twelve battle stars for World War II service, and was awarded one Presidential Unit Citation for cumulative action over four patrols. The tonnage of the ships sunk by Silversides amounted to 90,080 tons, ranking among the top five for tonnage sunk by an American submarine during the war. Judged by the Joint Army-Navy Assessment Committee (JANAC), Silversides has the most prolific combat record of any still-extant American submarine.

Other sources state that Silversides sank 31 ships totaling 100,685 tons during World War II.''U.S. Submarine Attacks During World War II book by John Alden U.S Naval Institute Press 1989

 USS Silversides Submarine Museum 

Originally opened as the Great Lakes Naval Memorial & Museum, the museum is now known as the USS Silversides Submarine Museum, which also includes  (a United States Coast Guard cutter) and a museum building.

The museum staff starts the USS Silversides'' Fairbanks Morse engines up to six times per year in order to keep the engines healthy.

See also 
 List of maritime museums in the United States

References 

Combined Great Lakes Navy Association Inc., press kit, late 1970s.

External links 

 USS Silversides Submarine Museum
 
 hazegray.org: USS Silversides
 
 First 13 War Patrol Reports on Microfilm
 14th War Patrol Report on Microfilm

Gato-class submarines
World War II submarines of the United States
Museum ships in Michigan
History of Chicago
Buildings and structures in Muskegon, Michigan
National Historic Landmarks in Michigan
National Historic Landmarks in Illinois
Ships built in Vallejo, California
1941 ships
Museums in Muskegon County, Michigan
Ships on the National Register of Historic Places in Michigan
World War II on the National Register of Historic Places
National Register of Historic Places in Muskegon County, Michigan